Deborah Sochaczewski Evelyn (born 12 March 1966) is a Brazilian actress.

Biography 
Of Jewish origin, Deborah is the daughter of economist Haroldo Bruce Evelyn and sociologist Suzana Sochaczewski Evelyn, and sister of the actor Carlos Evelyn.

Career
Deborah made her television debut at age 17, in the miniseries Moinhos de Vento, directed by Walter Avancini.

Among her television work can be highlighted the romantic Ruth of Vida Nova (1988/1989) and Lenita Penteado of A Gata Comeu (1985), the naive Raquel of Hipertensão (1986), the bitter Basília of the miniseries A Muralha and neurotic Beatriz Vasconcelos Amorim is Celebridade (2003/2004), by Gilberto Braga. in 2006, Salomé represented in the miniseries JK, everyone in Rede Globo.

Besides the TV, also works in theater and film, taking part in the film Mulheres do Brasil and The Greatest Love of All and O Banquete of the pieces and Deus da Carnificina (the latter on display in Brazil).

She lived her first rival in novels, Judith of Caras & Bocas. In 2011 she played Eunice in Insensato Coração. In 2013 she was cast in the telenovela Sangue Bom.

In 2015 Evelyn was set to portray Inês in Babilônia, but the direction of TV Globo moved her to the cast of the following telenovela, A Regra do Jogo, by João Emanuel Carneiro. In A Regra de Jogo, she portrays Kiki, daughter of a millionaire, that is kidnapped to the control of the own father and that falls in love with his kidnapper.

In 2017, she portrayed Alzira, in the telenovela Tempo de Amar.

Personal life
In 1988 she married television director Dennis Carvalho, with whom she had her only daughter, Luiza, in 1993. After 24 years of marriage, they separated in December 2012.

On April 26, 2014, Deborah married the German architect Detlev Schneider.

Filmography

Television

Film
 1988 - Mistério no Colégio Brasil - Ludmilla
 1994 - Lamarca .... Marina
 2001 - A Partilha .... Herself
 2006 - Mulheres do Brasil .... Rita
 2006 - The Greatest Love of All .... Carolina
 2017 - Diminuta .... Júlia

References

External links

1966 births
Living people
Brazilian people of Polish descent
Actresses from Rio de Janeiro (city)
Brazilian television actresses
Brazilian telenovela actresses
Brazilian film actresses
Brazilian stage actresses
Jewish agnostics
Brazilian agnostics